Robson de Sousa Vasconcelos Goes (born January 20, 1986) is a Brazilian football player who currently plays for Ceglédi VSE.

References 
HLSZ

1986 births
Living people
Brazilian footballers
Association football defenders
Nova Iguaçu Futebol Clube players
Kecskeméti TE players
Mezőkövesdi SE footballers
Ceglédi VSE footballers
Nemzeti Bajnokság I players
Brazilian expatriate footballers
Expatriate footballers in Hungary
Brazilian expatriate sportspeople in Hungary
Footballers from Brasília